Sarah Jane Smith: Buried Secrets is a Big Finish Productions audio drama based on the long-running British science fiction television series Doctor Who. It stars Elisabeth Sladen reprising her role as Sarah Jane Smith.

Plot 
By chance, Sarah Jane meets Harry Sullivan's brother: who is working at a research base in the Antarctic, which Sarah Jane is co-funding through her inheritance from Aunt Lavinia. Will Sullivan is trying to learn what has become of his brother, who has disappeared. He invites Sarah Jane to join him in the Antarctic as soon as she can conclude her current investigation.

Meanwhile, Sarah Jane learns of the death of Hilda Winters, then receives a letter from her from beyond the grave. The letter speaks of a 16th-century manuscript known as The Book of Tomorrows which foretells the future, and which is being urgently sought by the mysterious Keeper. Sarah Jane is in danger whilst she remains in possession of the letter.

When Sarah Jane's friend Natalie is arrested in Florence on a murder charge whilst taking part in an archaeological dig, Sarah Jane rushes to her assistance, and in Italy unearths a centuries-old conspiracy. Natalie has uncovered information about the manuscript, which has been missing for centuries. It predicts an alien invasion of the Earth, in which the key figure will be a person named Sarah Jane, with the initials SJS...

Cast 
 Sarah Jane Smith – Elisabeth Sladen
 Josh Townsend – Jeremy James
 Natalie Redfern – Sadie Miller
 Will Sullivan – Tom Chadbon
 Professor Edmons – Ivor Danvers
 Luca – Daniel Barzotti
 Newsreader – Shaun Ley
 Ben Kimmel- Jon Weinberg
 Keeper – Jacqueline Pearce
 Dexter – David Gooderson
 Maude – Patricia Leventon
 Sir Donald – Stephen Greif

Notes 
 Both Tom Chadbon and David Gooderson appeared in Fourth Doctor serials produced in 1979. Chadbon played Duggan in City of Death while Gooderson was the second actor to play Davros, the creator of the Daleks, in Destiny of the Daleks.
 Tom Chadbon, in addition to appearing in the Doctor Who serial City of Death with Tom Baker, also appeared in the Colin Baker television serial The Mysterious Planet (episodes 1 to 4 of The Trial of a Time Lord) in 1986. For Big Finish, Chadbon has also appeared with 8th Doctor Paul McGann, during The Eighth Doctor Adventures (2007), in the serial No More Lies. His science fiction credits include appearing in the BBC TV series Blake's 7, as Del Grant in the series 2 episode Countdown. He is also famous for playing Sandra's husband in the long running BBC situation comedy The Liver Birds.
 David Gooderson has extensive acting credits in television and radio going back forty years. He has twice been a member of the BBC Radio Drama Company, and has made over four hundred broadcasts. His science fiction credits outside Doctor Who include appearing in two cult radio shows: playing Tidy, the sentient android, in series 2 of Earthsearch; and the barman in The Hitchhiker's Guide to the Galaxy. 
 Jacqueline Pearce appeared in Doctor Who with Colin Baker and Patrick Troughton, in the TV serial The Two Doctors. Her science fiction credits include appearing in the BBC TV series Blake's 7 from 1978 to 1981, as series regular Supreme Commander Servalan.
 Stephen Greif's science fiction credits include appearing in the BBC TV series Blake's 7 in 1978, as series regular Space Commander Travis.

References

External links 
 Big Finish Productions – Sarah Jane Smith: Buried Secrets

Buried Secrets
2006 audio plays
Plays by David Bishop